Marianne Carbonnier-Burkard (born 16 April 1949) is a French historian of modern Protestantism and honorary docent at the Faculté de théologie protestante de Paris. She is vice-president of the Société de l'histoire du protestantisme français and a member of the Comité consultatif national d'éthique pour les sciences de la vie et de la santé (2013-2017).

Life 
Born in Poitiers, she and the magistrate Irène Carbonnier were both daughters of lawyer Jean Carbonnier and Madeleine Hugues, the latter being a granddaughter of Edmond Hugues, founder of the Musée du Désert

In 1974 she gained a doctorate in the third cycle of the history of philosophy at the université Paris IV with a thesis entitled Émigration et sécession pour cause religieuse, étude de philosophie politique (Emigration and secession for religious reasons, a study of political philosophy). She then became a curator at the Bibliothèque nationale de France (1976-1986) before starting a teaching and research career in the faculté de théologie protestante de Paris (1986-2012). She thus coordinated the activities of the Groupe de recherches en histoire des protestantismes and in 2015 became an associate member of the Laboratoire d’études sur les monothéismes.

She is also assistant-curator at the Musée du Désert, the main museum of French Protestantism, located at Mas Soubeyran in Mialet, as well as vice-president of the Société de l'histoire du protestantisme français.

Publications 
 Une histoire des protestants en France : XVIe – XXe siècles, avec Patrick Cabanel, Paris, Desclée de Brouwer, 1998
 Comprendre la révolte des camisards, Rennes : Éd. Ouest-France, 2008
 Jean Calvin, une vie, Paris, Desclée de Brouwer, 2009
 La révolte des camisards, Rennes, Éd. Ouest-France, 2012
 with Jean Baubérot, Histoire des Protestants : Une minorité en France (XVIe – XXIe siècle), Paris, Ellipses, 2016, 576 p. (ISBN 978-2-340-01521-0).

Bibliography
 Patrick Cabanel, « Marianne Carbonnier-Burkard », in Patrick Cabanel and André Encrevé (ed.s), Dictionnaire biographique des protestants français de 1787 à nos jours, tome 1 : A-C, Les Éditions de Paris Max Chaleil, Paris, 2015,

External links
  Biography on the 'Laboratoire d’études sur les monothéismes' site

References

Living people
1949 births
People from Poitiers
20th-century French historians
21st-century French historians
Reformation historians
Historians of Protestantism
French women curators